Rhonda Newman Keenum (born 1961) is an American political advisor working as a lobbyist for The WIT Group. Keenum had previously served in the administration of President George W. Bush.

Career
Rhonda Keenum served as director of the Office of Public Liaison from August to February 2006. She was also assistant secretary for trade promotion and director general of the United States Commercial Service, where she managed operations dedicated to assisting American companies to export and succeed in global markets.

Prior to joining the Administration, Keenum served as senior vice Ppesident of Edelman, a public relations firm. Earlier in her career, she worked for Congressman Roger Wicker as his administrative assistant and press secretary. Keenum also served as deputy director of convention and meetings at the Republican National Committee.

Personal life
Rhonda Keenum is married to Mississippi State University president Mark E. Keenum.

References

External links

1961 births
George W. Bush administration personnel
Living people
Mississippi Republicans
People from Booneville, Mississippi
Under Secretaries of Commerce for International Trade